Tunnel Hill is an unincorporated community in central Bedford Township, Coshocton County, Ohio, United States. It lies in the valley of the Little Wakatomika Creek a few miles south of Warsaw, along State Route 60 at its intersection with State Route 541.

History
Tunnel Hill had its start around 1873 when a railroad tunnel was completed near the site. A post office was established at Tunnel Hill in 1873, and remained in operation until it was discontinued in 1955.

References

Unincorporated communities in Coshocton County, Ohio
Unincorporated communities in Ohio